Dolgikh (from долгий meaning long) is a gender-neutral Russian surname of Siberian origin. It may refer to
Ivan Ilich Dolgikh (1904-1961), Soviet NKVD officer and Gulag administrator
Ivan Ivanovich Dolgikh (1896-1956), Soviet OGPU and NKVD officer, and Gulag administrator
Maria Dolgikh (born 1987), Russian table tennis player
Vladimir Dolgikh (1924-2020), Russian politician

References

Russian-language surnames